The South American Under-15 Championship for Women is a basketball tournament held about every year among the ten countries of South America and is organized in part by FIBA Americas. The tournament serves as a gateway to the FIBA Americas Under-16 Championship.

Summaries

Performances by nation

Participation details

References

External links
 Brazil history

Under-15
South
Basketball U15